Fogo (Portuguese for fire) may refer to:
 Fogo, Cape Verde
 Mount Fogo
 Fogo Island, Newfoundland, Canada
 Town of Fogo
 Fogo Aerodrome
 Fogo, Scottish Borders, a village in Berwickshire, Scotland
 Fogo Priory, a religious house of the above settlement
 Prior of Fogo
 Fogo Seamounts, Canada
 Gordon Fogo (1896–1952), Canadian lawyer and senator
 William M. Fogo (1841-1903), American politician
 Fogo (film), a 2012 film
 Oyem Airport, in Woleu-Ntem Province, Gabon, having ICAO code "FOGO"

See also 

 Fogo Island (disambiguation)